Ratnagiri Gas and Power Private Limited (RGPPL) is a Subsidiary of NTPC Limited. The company was established to take over and revive the assets of the defunct Dabhol Power Company. RGPPL owns one of India's largest and only LNG based power plants and the LNG regasification terminal at Dabhol.

History
The Ratnagiri gas and power company was made by the Government of Maharashtra and Government of India in 2005 to rescue the controversial and nearly defunct Dabhol power company, a gas powered electricity provider owned by Enron corporation. In 1992, Enron corporation signed a deal to build a gas powered power station at Dabhol, from which the government of Maharashtra would purchase electricity for 20 years. The project remained controversial from the beginning, mostly due to the high cost of electricity (more than 2,000 times what the government was paying per unit for hydro electricity) and corruption at the highest levels.  Despite protests, the project was built and began producing electricity in 1998. The Godbole committee report in 2001 presented a scathing criticism of the project and its terms.  The plant stopped production in 2001 when the government could not pay for its electricity costs. In 2002, Enron became bankrupt. In 2005, the plant was taken over by the Government of Maharashtra.

The company was established on 8 July 2005, with GAIL and NTPC each holding just over 25.51% of its equity. The Maharashtra State Electricity Board (MSEB) and financial institutions hold the remaining stock.

RGPPL has operationalised the 5 million tonnes per year LNG Block (Commissioning cargo ‘LNG Pioneer’). The vessel carrying 1,38,000 cubic meters of Liquefied Natural Gas (LNG) docked at the jetty brought back the memories of the Enron’s aborted Dabhol Power Companys (DPC) power project. The DPC project was later taken over by the Central Government which renamed it as RGPPL which began operations in May 2006. The RGPPL successfully began re-gasification process of the LNG thereby making the LNG jetty free to be used for regular berthing and unloading of LNG cargo. Its three power blocks supply a combined 1967 MW of electricity to India's western grid.

Capacity

See also

Dabhol Power Company

References

External links
 Official Site

Oil and gas companies of India
Companies based in Maharashtra
Ratnagiri district
Indian companies established in 2005
Energy in Maharashtra
Energy companies established in 2005
2005 establishments in Maharashtra